Predicament  is a 2010 comedy horror film based on the 1975 novel by Ronald Hugh Morrieson and starring Jemaine Clement of the musical comedy duo Flight of the Conchords plus Tim Finn of the Finn Brothers. Filmed in Hawera and Eltham in Taranaki, it was the last Morrieson novel to be adapted for cinema; his other three novels were filmed in the 1980s.

Plot
Predicament is a powerful and disturbing account of the psychological fantasy world of adolescence with the familiar small-town setting of Morrieson's writing, so is a coming-of-age novel and a crime comedy. Naïve teenager Cedric Williamson is involved with two older criminally inclined misfits in photographing and blackmailing amorous couples, and ends up an accomplice to murder. It is set in a 1930s Taranaki town similar to Morrieson's Hawera.

But while Morrieson's first two novels were published in Australia, Predicament was rejected by Angus & Robertson. It went through numerous drafts, many abandoned, before (like Pallet on the Floor) being published posthumously by Dunmore Press of Palmerston North in 1975.

Cast

Film
The opening scene is of a hunched figure digging in the darkness, and demonstrates Simon Raby's superb cinematography; as does the next (daytime) shot of a high rickety wooden tower built by Cedric's mentally unbalanced father Martin. But when the characters start talking, what ought to be a darkly hilarious crime comedy dissolves into mush, according to reviewer David Larsen. The screenplay was written by the director Jason Stutter, who chopped up and rearranged Morrieson's dialogue.

References

External links
  
 Predicament at NZonScreen (with video extracts) 
 Predicament at the Rotten Tomatoes website 

2010 films
2010 horror films
Films set in New Zealand
2010 comedy horror films
Films set in the 1930s
Films shot in New Zealand
Films based on New Zealand novels
New Zealand comedy horror films
2010 comedy films
2010s English-language films